"Good-bye France (You'll Never Be Forgotten by the U.S.A.)" is a World War I song written by Irving Berlin. It was published in 1918 by Waterson, Berlin & Snyder, Inc., in New York City. The sheet music cover, illustrated by Albert Wilfred Barbelle, features French and American soldiers shaking hands with the Statue of Liberty in the background.
 
The sheet music can be found at the Pritzker Military Museum & Library.

References 

Bibliography

1918 songs
Songs of World War I
Songs written by Irving Berlin